Edwin George Morgan  (27 April 1920 – 19 August 2010) was a Scottish poet and translator associated with the Scottish Renaissance. He is widely recognised as one of the foremost Scottish poets of the 20th century. In 1999, Morgan was made the first Glasgow Poet Laureate. In 2004, he was named as the first Makar or National Poet for Scotland.

Life and career
Morgan was born in Glasgow and grew up in Rutherglen. His parents were Presbyterian. As a child he was not surrounded by books, nor did he have any literary acquaintances. Schoolmates labelled him a swot. He convinced his parents to finance his membership of several book clubs in Glasgow. The Faber Book of Modern Verse (1936) was a "revelation" to him, he later said.

Morgan entered the University of Glasgow in 1937. It was at university that he studied French and Russian, while self-educating in "a good bit of Italian and German" as well. After interrupting his studies to serve in World War II as a non-combatant conscientious objector with the Royal Army Medical Corps, Morgan graduated in 1947 and became a lecturer at the university. He worked there until his retirement as a full professor in 1980.

Morgan described 'CHANGE RULES!' as 'the supreme graffito', whose liberating double-take suggests both a lifelong commitment to formal experimentation and his radically democratic left-wing political perspectives. From traditional sonnet to blank verse, from epic seriousness to camp and ludic nonsense; and whether engaged in time-travelling space fantasies or exploring contemporary developments in physics and technology, the range of Morgan's voices is a defining attribute.

Morgan first outlined his sexuality in Nothing Not Giving Messages: Reflections on his Work and Life (1990). He had written many famous love poems, among them "Strawberries" and "The Unspoken", in which the love object was not gendered; this was partly because of legal problems at the time but also out of a desire to universalise them, as he made clear in an interview with Marshall Walker. At the opening of the Glasgow LGBT Centre in 1995, he read a poem he had written for the occasion, and presented it to the centre as a gift.

In 2002, he became the patron of Our Story Scotland. At the opening of the Scottish Parliament building in Edinburgh on 9 October 2004, Liz Lochhead read a poem written for the occasion by Morgan, titled "Poem for the Opening of the Scottish Parliament".  She was announced as Morgan's successor as Scots Makar in January 2011.

Near the end of his life, Morgan reached a new audience after collaborating with the Scottish band Idlewild on their album The Remote Part. In the closing moments of the album's final track "In Remote Part/ Scottish Fiction", he recites a poem, "Scottish Fiction", written specifically for the song.

In 2007, Morgan contributed two poems to the compilation Ballads of the Book, for which a range of Scottish writers created poems to be made into songs by Scottish musicians. Morgan's songs "The Good Years" and "The Weight of Years" were performed by Karine Polwart and Idlewild respectively.

Nobel Laureate Seamus Heaney "[paid] formal homage" during a 2005 visit.

In later life Morgan was cared for at a residential home as his health worsened. He published a collection in April 2010, months before his death, titled Dreams and Other Nightmares to mark his 90th birthday. Up until his death, he was the last survivor of the canonical 'Big Seven' (the others being Hugh MacDiarmid, Robert Garioch, Norman MacCaig, Iain Crichton Smith, George Mackay Brown, and Sorley MacLean).

On 19 August 2010, Edwin Morgan died of pneumonia in Glasgow at the age of 90. The Scottish Poetry Library made the announcement in the morning. Tributes came from, among others, politicians Alex Salmond and Iain Gray, as well as Carol Ann Duffy, the UK Poet Laureate. In his will he left almost £1 million to the Scottish National Party. Morgan also left £45,000 to a number of friends, former colleagues and charity organisations and set aside another £1 million for the creation of the Edwin Morgan Poetry Award, an annual award scheme for young poets in Scotland. In 2012, The Edwin Morgan Trust was established to administer the generous Award which the poet wished to create from the earnings of a long and distinguished writing career. From 27 April 2020 The Edwin Morgan Trust will be celebrating the life and work of Edwin Morgan with a year long centenary programme.

Poetry

Morgan worked in a wide range of forms and styles, from the sonnet to concrete poetry. His Collected Poems appeared in 1990. He has also translated from a wide range of languages, including Russian, Hungarian, French, Italian, Latin, Spanish, Portuguese, German and Old English (Beowulf). Many of these are collected in Rites of Passage. Selected Translations (1976). His 1952 translation of Beowulf has become a standard translation in America.

Morgan was also influenced by the American beat poets, with their simple, accessible ideas and language being prominent features in his work.

His poetry may be studied as a Scottish Text for National 5 English. Currently, if Edwin Morgan is studied at National 5, pupils study:  "Winter" – a depressed narrator describing Bingham's pond during winter; "In the Snackbar"; "Glasgow 5 March 1971"; "Good Friday" – a poem about a bus journey on the Christian holiday; "Trio" – a tale about the power of friendship; Glasgow Sonnet (I) – a petrarchan sonnet about poverty.

In 1968 Morgan wrote "Starlings in George Square". This poem could be read as a comment on society's reluctance to accept the integration of different races. Other people have also considered it to be about the Russian Revolution in which "Starling" could be a reference to "Stalin".

Other notable poems include:

 "The Death of Marilyn Monroe" (1962) – an outpouring of emotion and a social criticism after the death of prominent actress, Marilyn Monroe
 "King Billy" (1968) – flashback of the gang warfare in Glasgow led by Billy Fullerton in the 1930s.
 "Glasgow 5 March 1971" – robbery by two youths by pushing an unsuspecting couple through a shop window on Sauchiehall Street
 "In the Snackbar" – concise description of an encounter with a disabled pensioner in a Glasgow café.
 "A Good Year for Death" (26 September 1977) – a description of five famous people from the world of popular culture who died in 1977
 "Poem for the Opening of the Scottish Parliament" – which was read by Liz Lochhead at the opening ceremony because he was too ill to read it in person. (9 October 2004)

Published work

Books

 Dies Irae, 1952 – first published in Poems of Thirty Years, Carcanet New Press, 1982
 Beowulf: A Verse Translation into Modern English, Hand and Flower Press, 1952
 The Vision of Cathkin Braes and Other Poems, William MacLellan, 1952
 The Cape of Good Hope (limited edition), Pound Press, 1955
 Poems from Eugenio Montale (translator), School of Art, University of Reading, 1959
 Sovpoems: Brecht, Neruda, Pasternak, Tsvetayeva, Mayakovsky, Martynov, Yevtushenko (translator), Migrant Press, 1961
 Collins Albatross Book of Longer Poems (editor), Collins, 1963
 Starryveldt, Eugen Gomringer Press, 1965
 Emergent Poems, Hansjörg Mayer, 1967
 Gnomes, Akros publications, 1968
 The Second Life, Edinburgh University Press, 1968
 Selected Poems of Sándor Weöres and Selected Poems of Ferenc Juhász (translator and introduction for Sándor Weöres), Penguin, 1970
 The Horseman's Word: Concrete Poems, Akros, 1970
 Twelve Songs, Castlelaw Press, 1970
 Glasgow Sonnets, Castlelaw Press, 1972
 Instamatic Poems, Ian McKelvie, 1972
 Wi the haill voice: 25 poems by Vladimir Mayakovsky (translator and glossary), Carcanet, 1972
 From Glasgow to Saturn, Carcanet, 1973
 Nuspeak8: Being a Visual Poem by Edwin Morgan, Scottish Arts Council, 1973
 The Whittrick: a Poem in Eight Dialogues, Akros, 1973
 Essays, Carcanet, 1974
 Fifty Renascence Love-Poems (translator), Whiteknights Press, 1975
 Rites of Passage (translator), 1976
 Edwin Morgan: an interview by Marshall Walker, Akros, 1977
 The New Divan, 1977
 Selected poems by August Graf von Platen-Hallermünde (translator), Castlelaw Press, 1978
 Star Gate: Science Fiction Poems, Third Eye Centre, 1979
 Scottish Satirical Verse (compiler), Carcanet, 1980
 Grendel, Mariscat, 1982
 Poems of Thirty Years, Carcanet New Press, 1982
 The Apple-Tree (modern version of a medieval Dutch play), Third Eye Centre, 1982
 Takes/Grafts, Mariscat, 1983
 Sonnets from Scotland, Mariscat, 1984
 Selected Poems, 1985
 From the Video Box, Mariscat, 1986
 Newspoems, Wacy, 1987
 Tales from Limerick Zoo (illustrated by David Neilson), Mariscat, 1988
 Themes on a Variation, 1988
 Collected Poems (republished 1996 with index), 1990
 Crossing the Border: Essays on Scottish Literature, 1990
 Nothing Not Giving Messages: Reflections on his Work and Life (edited by Hamish Whyte), Polygon, 1990
 Hold Hands Among the Atoms: 70 Poems, Mariscat, 1991
 Edmond Rostand's Cyrano de Bergerac: A New Verse Translation (translator), 1992
 Fragments by József Attila (translator), Morning Star Publications, 1992
 MacCaig, Morgan, Lochhead: Three Scottish Poets (edited and introduced by Roderick Watson), Canongate, 1992
 Cecilia Vicuña:PALABRARmas/WURDWAPPINschaw, Morning Star Publications, 1994
 Sweeping Out the Dark, 1994
 Long Poems – But How Long?   (W. D. Thomas Memorial Lecture), University of Wales, Swansea, 1995
 Collected Translations, 1996
 St. Columba: The Maker on High (translator), Mariscat, 1997
 Virtual and Other Realities, 1997
 Chistopher Marlowe's Dr Faustus (a new version), Canongate, 1999
 Demon, Mariscat, 1999
 A.D.: A Trilogy of Plays on the Life of Jesus, Carcanet, 2000
 Jean Racine: Phaedra (translation of Phèdre), 2000 (Oxford-Weidenfeld Translation Prize)
 New Selected Poems, 2000
 Attila József: Sixty Poems (translator), Mariscat, 2001
 Cathures, 2002
 Love and a Life: 50 Poems by Edwin Morgan, Mariscat, 2003
 The Battle of Bannockburn (translator), SPL in association with Akros and Mariscat, 2004
 Tales from Baron Munchausen, Mariscat, 2005
 The Play of Gilgamesh, 2005
 Thirteen Ways of Looking at Rillie, Enitharmon, 2006
 A Book of Lives, 2007

Articles
 The Politics of Poetry, review of Yeats, Eliot, Pound and the Politics of Poetry by Cairns Craig, in Hearn, Sheila G. (ed.), Cencrastus No. 12, Spring 1983, p. 44, 
 Novy Mir and the Stalinist Whirlwind, a review of Within the Whirlwind by Eugenia Ginsburg and "Novy Mir": A Case Study in the Politics of Literature 1952 - 1958 by Edith Rogovin Frankel (ed.), in Hearn, Sheila G. (ed.), Cencrastus No. 14, Autumn 1983, p. 54,

Reviews
 Hearn, Sheila G. (1980), review of Edwin Morgan (ed.), Scottish Satirical Verse, in Cencrastus No. 4, Winter 1980–81, p. 49,

Awards and honours
 1972 PEN Memorial Medal (Hungary)
 1982 OBE
 1983 Saltire Society Scottish Book of the Year Award for  Poems of Thirty Years
 1985 Soros Translation Award (New York)
 1998 Stakis Prize for Scottish Writer of the Year for Virtual and Other Realities
 2000 Queen's Gold Medal for Poetry
 2001 Oxford-Weidenfeld Translation Prize for Jean Racine: Phaedra
 2002 The Saltire Society's Andrew Fletcher of Saltoun award for notable service to Scotland
 2003 Jackie Forster Memorial Award for Culture
 2003 Lifetime Achievement Award for Literature, from the Saltire Society and the Scottish Arts Council
 2007 Shortlisted for T. S. Eliot Prize for A Book of Lives.
 2008 Scottish Arts Council Book of the Year Award

Further reading
 Hubbard, Tom, "Doing Something Uncustomary: Edwin Morgan and Attila Józef", in Hubbard, Tom (2022), Invitation to the Voyage: Scotland, Europe and Literature, Rymour, pp. 115 - 124,

References

Further reading
 Scott, Alexander (1982), Edwin Morgan: Experimenter Extraordinary, in Lindsay, Maurice (ed), The Scottish Review: Arts and Environment 28, pp. 22–26, 
 White, Kenneth (1983), Morgan's Range, in Hearn, Sheila G. (1983), Cencrastus No. 12, Spring 1983, pp. 32–35, 
 Wącior, Sławomir  (2013), From Slate to Jupiter - Poetic Patterns of Edwin Morgan's "Sonnets from Scotland" in Scottish Studies Review, 1, 47–57,

External links
Edwin Morgan Trust official site – home of the Edwin Morgan Poetry Award and 2020 Edwin Morgan Centenary
Archive of Edwin Morgan's author website 
The Edwin Morgan Archive at the Scottish Poetry Library
Profile at Modern Scottish Writers
Enitharmon Press website
BBC Scotland biography and bibliography website
"Strawberries" via The Guardian

1920 births
2010 deaths
Academics of the University of Glasgow
Alumni of the University of Glasgow
Officers of the Order of the British Empire
Scottish conscientious objectors
People educated at the High School of Glasgow
British Poetry Revival
Fellows of the Royal Society of Literature
British gay writers
Scottish LGBT poets
Writers from Glasgow
People from Rutherglen
People educated at Rutherglen Academy
Scots Makars
Scottish Renaissance
Scottish scholars and academics
Scottish translators
Royal Army Medical Corps soldiers
British Army personnel of World War II
Deaths from pneumonia in Scotland
Fellows of the Royal Society of Edinburgh
Hungarian–English translators
21st-century Scottish writers
20th-century Scottish poets
21st-century Scottish poets
21st-century British male writers
Scottish male poets
Scottish science fiction writers
20th-century British translators
21st-century British translators
20th-century British male writers
Claddagh Records artists
Scottish republicans
Visual poets